The New Zealand Cancer Control Trust (NZCCT) was formed in February 2001 with funding support from the Cancer Society of New Zealand and the Child Cancer Foundation. It has subsequently obtained further funding from its founder organisations and from the Genesis Oncology Trust (now the Cancer Research Trust New Zealand) and has also generated income through contract work for the Ministry of Health.

Timeline

References

External links
 Official website of NZCCT

Charities based in New Zealand
New Zealand Cancer Control
Medical and health organisations based in New Zealand
2001 establishments in New Zealand
2017 disestablishments in New Zealand